The Raveonettes are a Danish indie rock duo, consisting of Sune Rose Wagner on guitar, instruments and vocals, and Sharin Foo on bass, guitar and vocals. Their music is characterized by close two-part vocal harmonies inspired by The Everly Brothers coupled with hard-edged electric guitar overlaid with liberal doses of noise. Their songs juxtapose the structural and chordal simplicity of 1950s and 1960s rock with intense electric instrumentation, driving beats, and often dark lyrical content (e.g., crime, drugs, murder, suicide, love, lust, and betrayal), similar to another of the band's influences, The Velvet Underground.

Biography

Early years 
 
The duo met in Copenhagen and, after forming the band, began recording Whip It On at Once Was & Sauna Recording Studio, a former Sony Studios facility. They booked the studio for three weeks during non-session down time late in 2001 and handled all production chores by themselves. Adding guitarist Manoj Ramdas and jazz drummer Jakob Hoyer, The Raveonettes booked one of their first gigs at the SPOT festival in Aarhus, the second largest city in Denmark. After the release of Whip It On on the seminal Danish Crunchy Frog label, Hoyer and Ramdas would contribute to the next three Raveonettes albums, along with other additional musicians. However, by the time Lust Lust Lust was released in 2007, Sune and Sharin would be the only two musicians credited, showing a return to the dynamic around the time of the mini-album.

Officially,the band was discovered by Rolling Stone editor David Fricke at the SPOT festival, and his rave review of the duo immediately resulted in a number of offers from major labels. Unofficially, the band discovered that David Fricke would be present at the SPOT festival, and they rushed a band together and headed for the festival. The band is managed by Richard Gottehrer, who has been with them from the start.

Whip It On was named "Best Rock Album of the Year" at the Danish Music Awards (Denmark's Grammy equivalent) on 1 March 2003, while The Raveonettes were picked by Rolling Stone and Q Magazine as being among the harbingers of the "Next Wave" of contemporary music.

In 2006, Blender named Sharin Foo one of rock's hottest women, alongside Courtney Love, Joan Jett and Liz Phair.

Chain Gang of Love 
The band's first full-length album, Chain Gang of Love, was produced by Richard Gottehrer and The Raveonettes' own Sune Rose Wagner. The album was recorded in Denmark and New York from 9–17 October, 6–12 November, and 4–10 December 2002, and mixed in London in early 2003. The thirteen songs on Chain Gang of Love are written by Sune Rose Wagner with the exception of "That Great Love Sound", which Sune co-wrote with Gottehrer. Portions of this song were featured in a U.S. ad for Kmart.  The album is notable in that all the songs were written in the key B-flat major.

Pretty in Black 
The band's follow-up album, Pretty in Black, broadened their musical palette, featuring guest vocals from Ronnie Spector of The Ronettes as well as guest instrumental spots from Maureen Tucker (of The Velvet Underground) and Martin Rev (of Suicide). This was their first album in which Sharin Foo did not play bass; instead, The Raveonettes added bass player Anders Christensen, who had toured with seminal jazz drummer Paul Motian, amongst others. Christensen recorded on the album and toured with the band. At the end of the 2005 tour, guitar player Manoj Ramdas left the band to concentrate on his new band SPEKTR.

The video for the single "Love in a Trashcan", directed by Peder Pedersen, features pink bars and blocks with words like "Vamp" and "Teaser" scrolling by the band members, and is reminiscent of an early-1960s cosmetic ad.

Lust Lust Lust 
The duo's third studio album, Lust Lust Lust, was released in November 2007 in Europe and February 2008 in the U.S. The album received generally positive reviews, with the NME'''s Hardeep Phull describing it as "their most engrossing album."

In December 2008, Sune Rose Wagner released a solo album, simply titled Sune Rose Wagner. All of the songs are sung in his native language of Danish.

 In and Out of Control 
The Raveonettes' fourth album, In and Out of Control, was released 6 October 2009, with "Last Dance" released as the lead-off single. The album was co-written and produced by Thomas Troelsen. Both "Last Dance" and "Suicide", another song from the album, have been featured on The CW's Gossip Girl.

Raven in the GraveRaven in the Grave, The Raveonettes fifth album, was released 4 April 2011. The album has produced three singles to date.

Observator
The duo released a new album, titled Observator, on 11 September 2012. The lead single 'Observations' was released 25 June. The second single 'She Owns the Streets' was released 9 July.

Pe'ahi
The band's seventh album, Pe'ahi, was released 22 July 2014. Due to the purposeful lack of promotion or formal announcement of a release date the album was dubbed a "surprise" release.

2016 Atomized (Anti-Album), hiatus and return
In 2015 the band announced the Rave-Sound-of-the-Month saying that in every month of 2016 the band were recording and releasing a new song. Dubbed by the band as the Anti-Album, the twelve songs were released individually for download online in each month of the year and were released 21 April 2017 as a full album titled 2016 Atomized.

In March 2018 the band surprise released a song called "Ghost", a previously unreleased track from 2016 Atomized. The duo are also set to embark on an indefinite hiatus to allow Sune to release a solo album in 2018; though this never materialised. In November 2020, the band released the song "Snowstorm", their first release in over two years.

The band returned to touring in 2022, performing their EP Whip It On in full at various festivals throughout the summer as well as a tour at the end of the year. New music is also in the works.

 Instruments 
During live performances, the band usually utilizes Fender instruments (Sune uses a number of Jazzmasters while Sharin opts for either Mustang or jazz bass, and a Jazzmaster). Sune plays a number of different guitars and basses on their albums, including different Fenders, Gibsons, and Gretsches. In the fall of 2005, the tour van containing the band's equipment (including Sune's prized 1960 Jazzmaster and Sharin's treasured Gretsch 6120) was stolen during their tour of the U.S.A.

On their 2007 tour, the band used the following effects pedals:

Sune:
 Electro-Harmonx Pulsar
 ProCo Rat Distortion
 Boss Mega Distortion MD-2
 Dunlop Jimi Hendrix Octave Fuzz
 Boss Digital Reverb RV-2 & RV-5
 Danelectro Spring King
 Boss Chromatic Tuner TU-2

Sharin:
 Boss TR-2 Tremolo
 ProCo Rat Distortion
 Boss Digital Reverb RV-5 (3x)
 Zvex Fuzz Factory Vexter
 Boss Chromatic Tuner TU-2

 Band line-up by album 
 Chain Gang of Love line-up 
 Sune Rose Wagner: guitars and vocals
 Sharin Foo: bass and vocals
 Manoj Ramdas: guitars
 Jakob Hoyer: drums

 Pretty in Black line-up 
 Sune Rose Wagner: guitars, vocals, synth, percussion, drums, bass, and programming
 Sharin Foo: vocals and percussion
 Jakob Hoyer: drums and percussion
 Anders Christensen: bass, percussion, and organ
 Manoj Ramdas: guitar

 Subsequent line-up 
 Sune Rose Wagner: instruments and vocals
 Sharin Foo: vocals

 Discography 
 Studio albums 

Notes
1 Lust Lust Lust's inclusion of 3D glasses rendered it ineligible for the UK Albums Chart.

 EPs 
 Whip It On (6 August 2002) (UK No. 114)
 Sometimes They Drop By (23 September 2008)
 Beauty Dies (21 October 2008)
 Wishing You a Rave Christmas (25 November 2008)
 Into the Night (24 April 2012) (DEN No. 36)
 The End (23 July 2015)

 Compilations 
 Rarities/B-Sides (15 December 2011)

 Singles 

 Soundtracks and compilations FIFA 2004 (2003) with "That Great Love Sound"Driv3r (2004) with "Bowels of the Beast"
 Stubbs the Zombie: The Soundtrack (2005) with "My Boyfriend's Back" (cover of The Angels' #1 hit)
 Nordkraft – Original Soundtrack (2005) with "Beat City"
 Amnesty International's Instant Karma (2007) with "One Day at a Time" (John Lennon cover, download only)Whip It! Soundtrack (2009) with "Dead Sound"Drive Angry Soundtrack (2011) with "You Want the Candy"Batman: Arkham City (2011) with "Oh, Stranger"Catch .44 Soundtrack (2011) with "Dead Sound"Van God Los de serie (2012) with "Evil Seeds"Lockout (2012) with "Beat City"A Psych Tribute to the Doors (2014) with "The End" (The Doors cover)American Honey (2016) with "Recharge & Revolt"Can't Get You Out of My Head'' (2021) with "Recharge & Revolt"

References

External links

 
 Interview with Sharin Foo + Sune Rose Wagner by Strangeways Radio – 30 September 2012
 The Raveonettes' Sharin Foo:  The New Gay Interview

Rock music duos
Danish indie rock groups
Noise pop musical groups
Danish musical duos